Namibia competed at the 2008 Summer Olympics in Beijing, People's Republic of China.

Athletics
 
Beata Naigambo received a qualifying berth for the Olympics after winning the Nedbank South African Marathon Championships.
Hilaria Johannes also qualified. Agnes Samaria and Stephan Louw still need to  get through the selection process.

Men

Women

Boxing

Jafet Uutoni won a gold medal in the first leg of the Olympic qualifiers for African states in Algiers, Algeria. At the second round of qualification, which was held in Namibia, fellow Namibians Mujandjae Kasuto (gold medal, welterweight) and Julius Indongo (bronze medal, lightweight) also qualified for the games.

Cycling 

Eric Hoffman and Mannie Heymans qualified.

Road

Mountain biking

Shooting 
 
Gaby Ahrens qualified for the Trap women's competition

Women

References

Namibia
2008
Summer Olympics